Beinn Fhionnlaidh is a mountain in the Highlands of Scotland. It is situated on the south side of Loch Mullardoch, at the end of Glen Cannich, about 60 km west of Inverness.

Ascent
Beinn Fhionnlaidh is a very inaccessible mountain, some distance from the nearest road, so usually involves a long walk in. One route is to start from the end of Loch Beinn a' Mheadhoin in Glen Affric, then follow a path up Gleann nam Fiadh. From there, it is necessary to climb up and over the east ridge of Càrn Eige, before following its north ridge to Beinn Fhionnlaidh, via Bealach Beag.

Another approach is from the west, starting from the end of the road at Killilan. From there follow a track along Glen Elchaig to Iron Lodge, then a path to the western end of Loch Mullardoch, at the foot of Beinn Fhionnlaidh.

An easier alternative is to travel by boat along Loch Mullardoch to the foot of Beinn Fhionnlaidh, then climb straight up.

References

Munros
Mountains and hills of the Northwest Highlands
Marilyns of Scotland
One-thousanders of Scotland
Mountains and hills of Highland (council area)